Altogether was a Canadian musical variety television miniseries which aired on CBC Television in 1975.

Premise
This musical variety series was hosted by Ken Maslowsky, a vocalist who performed on the show with fellow-singer Iona Iliant. Bob McMullin, who previously worked on CBC's Let's Go, was the series' musical director. Miriam Bronstein, the Chai Folk Ensemble, Harvey Chochinov, Scott Walker and Sara Somner were among the show's guests.

Production
Altogether was produced by Dale Nelson in Winnipeg on location at the Manitoba Theatre Club.

Scheduling
The series aired on Tuesdays at 9:30 p.m. (Eastern) in July and August 1975.

References

External links
 

CBC Television original programming
1975 Canadian television series debuts
1975 Canadian television series endings
Television shows filmed in Winnipeg